Triplophysa leptosoma (formerly Indotriplophysa leptosoma) is a species of stone loach in the genus Triplophysa.
It is found only in Xizang, China.

References

leptosoma
Taxa named by Solomon Herzenstein
Fish described in 1888